Eucyclotoma trivaricosa is a species of sea snail, a marine gastropod mollusk in the family Raphitomidae.

Description
The size of the mollusks shell reaches up to 15 mm in length and is light yellowish white in color.

The shell shows four or five revolving ridges on the body whorl, with intermediate close revolving striae. There are no longitudinal ribs except on the upper whorls of the spire, subcontinuously three-varicose.

The uppermost whorls are strongly variced, the lower ones usually plain.

Distribution
It was originally found off Mauritius and Réunion; also in the Gulf of Oman.

References

 E. von Martens, iMollusken. Pp. 179–353 In K. Moebius, F. Richters & E. von Martens, Beiträge zur Meeresfauna der Insel Mauritius und der Seychellen. Berlin: Gutmann
 Kilburn, R.N. (1977) Taxonomic studies on the marine Mollusca of southern Africa and Mozambique. Part 1. Annals of the Natal Museum, 23, 173–214
 Liu J.Y. [Ruiyu] (ed.)(2008). Checklist of marine biota of China seas. China Science Press. 1267 pp.

External links
 
 Gastropods.com: Eucyclotoma trivaricosa

trivaricosa
Gastropods described in 1880